St Giles' Church, Darlton is a Grade II* listed parish church in the Church of England in Darlton.

History

The church dates from the beginning of the 13th century. The chancel and nave were rebuilt in 1863 by Thomas Chambers Hine.

The churchyard contains three Grade II listed chest tombs, and the lychgate and churchyard walls are also Grade II listed.

References

Church of England church buildings in Nottinghamshire
Grade II* listed churches in Nottinghamshire